Sichinava or Sitchinava is a Georgian surname. Notable people with the surname include:

Anzor Sitchinava (born 1995), Georgian rugby union player
Data Sitchinava (born 1989), Georgian footballer
Giorgi Sichinava (born 1944), Georgian footballer
Tengiz Sichinava (1972–2021), Georgian footballer

Georgian-language surnames
Surnames of Georgian origin